Yukarıcambaz is a village in the Çıldır District, Ardahan Province, Turkey. Its population is 331 (2021). The old name of the village is Cambaz Ulya.

Population

References

Villages in Çıldır District